CMX may refer to:

 CMX (band), a Finnish rock band
 CMX (DVD) by CMX
 CMX (comics), a manga brand by DC Comics
 Corel Presentation Exchange (CMX), a Corel Metafile Exchange file format supported by CorelDRAW
 CMX Systems, a collaboration between CBS and Memorex which developed video editing systems in the 1970s
 A video Edit decision list format
 The IATA code (International Air Transport Association) for Houghton County Memorial Airport near Calumet, Michigan
 910 in Roman numerals
 Short name given to Carrickmacross by locals
 Abbreviation for COMEX, a commodities exchange in the CME Group
 The brand used by Cinemex for their United States locations